Diocese of Bosnia (Latin: Dioecesis Bosniensis) was a Roman Catholic diocese that existed in Bosnia between the 11th and 15th centuries, and remained formally in existence until 1773.

History

It is not known precisely when the Bosnian diocese was established. Based on a collection of historical documents Provinciale Vetus, published in 1188, which mention it twice, once subordinated to the Archdiocese of Split, and another time under the Archdiocese of Ragusa, it is assumed that it came into existence between 1060 and 1075. During the 12th century, it was contested between those two archdioceses as well as another two, the Archdiocese of Antivari and the Archdiocese of Kalocsa. In 1244, an endowment of the parishes of Đakovo and Blezna by King Béla IV of Hungary listed the other parishes of the diocese, namely Vrhbosna, Neretva, Lepenica, Vidgossa (Viduša), Mile (near today's Visoko), Lašva, Uskoplje, Brod (near today's Zenica), Borač (near today's Rogatica).

In the 13th and 14th centuries, the Bishops of Bosnia were mainly Dominican missionaries who were sent in to combat the spread of the Bosnian Church. At the turn of the 14th century, the Franciscans also arrived with the same purpose, at first in Usora and Soli, at the request of Stephen Dragutin of Serbia. The two orders engaged in a prolonged dispute over the control of the province, in which the Franciscans ultimately prevailed, yet the weakened diocese still succumbed to the Ottoman conquest of Bosnia in 1463.

During the Ottoman occupation, the bishop of Bosnia had no effective control over the territory of Bosnia, rather, the Franciscan Province of Bosna Srebrena remained the primary vessel of Catholicism in the area. In 1735, the Holy See founded the Apostolic Vicariate for Bosnia, and assigned Franciscans as apostolic vicars to direct it, thereby formally ending the jurisdiction of this diocese over Bosnia.

In 1773, pope Clement XIV united formally the diocese with the Diocese of Syrmia on demand of the Holy Roman Empress and Queen of Hungary and Croatia, Maria Theresa. The 1773 change subordinated it to the Archdiocese of Zagreb. In 1881, the Archdiocese of Vrhbosna was established, that included the actual territory of Bosnia.
The Diocese of Bosnia (Ðakovo) and Srijem became the present-day Archdiocese of Ðakovo-Osijek.

Bishops of Bosnia

References

Sources

Another sources 
 Magyar katolikus lexikon I–XV. Főszerk. Diós István; szerk. Viczián János. Budapest: Szent István Társulat. 1993–2010., list of bishops: 

Dioceses established in the 11th century
1773 disestablishments
Former Roman Catholic dioceses in Bosnia and Herzegovina
Religion in Bosnia and Herzegovina during Ottoman period
Religion in medieval Bosnia and Herzegovina